Eichwalde is a railway station for the town of Eichwalde in Brandenburg.

References

Eichwalde
Railway stations in Brandenburg
Buildings and structures in Dahme-Spreewald